Absa Bank Mauritius Limited (ABML), formerly known as Barclays Bank Mauritius Limited, is a commercial bank in Mauritius, licensed by the Bank of Mauritius, the country's central bank and national banking regulator.

Location
The headquarters of the bank are located at Absa House, 68 Wall Street, Cybercity, Ebene, Mauritius.

Overview
Absa Bank Mauritius is a large financial services company, serving corporate clients, high networth individuals, retail customers and small and medium enterprises. As of September 2010, the bank had assets of MUR:127,295,000,000 (US$3.343  billion), with shareholders' equity of MUR:16,011,000,000 (US$420.494 million).

This bank is a subsidiary of Absa Group Limited, a financial services conglomerate, headquartered in South Africa, with subsidiaries in 12 African countries and with assets in excess of US$87 billion as of 30 June 2017, whose shares of stock trade on the Johannesburg Stock Exchange under the symbol ABG.

History
According to the archives of Barclays Bank Mauritius, the oldest bank in Mauritius that became a component of the bank, is The National Bank of South Africa, which established a branch in the country in 1919. In 1925, Anglo-Egyptian Bank, Colonial Bank and National Bank of South Africa were merged to form Barclays Bank (Dominion, Colonial and Overseas). Since then the bank went through mergers, acquisitions and divestitures. Barclays Bank Mauritius operated as a branch of Barclays, until 1 June 2013, when it was incorporated as Barclays Bank Mauritius. That same year, the bank became a member of Barclays Africa Group, with Barclays Plc holding a controlling 62.3 percent majority ownership.

Name change
In 2016, Barclays, which owned 62.3 percent of Barclays Africa Group (BAG), the then majority shareholder of Barclays Bank of Mauritius Limited, decided to divest its majority shareholding in BAG, worth £3.5 billion at that time. In 2017 Barclays reduced its shareholding in BAG to 14.9 percent.

Subsequently, in 2018 BAG re-branded to Absa Group Limited.
Under the terms of that re-brand, Absa has until June 2020 to change the names of its subsidiaries in 12 African countries.

In Mauritius, the re-brand concluded on 10 February 2020, when both the bank's legal and business names became Absa Bank Mauritius Limited.

Governance
The bank is supervised by a ten-person board of directors, chaired by Iqbal Rajahbalee, one of the non-executive directors. The managing director and CEO is Ravin Dajee.

See also
Absa Bank (Mauritius) Limited
List of banks in Mauritius
List of banks in Africa

References

External links
  Company Website

Banks of Mauritius
Absa Group Limited
Banks established in 1919
1919 establishments in Mauritius
Companies based in Ebene, Mauritius